Ammāmeparāni (Persian:عمامه‌پرانی; "turban throwing") or "knocking off the turban" refers to a protest action by Iranians in which they throw the turban off the head of a mullah (Persian: Akhund) in order to express their disgust with the Shia clergy and therefore insult it. During the Mahsa Amini protests in Iran of 2022, people would take videos while knocking off turbans and publish them on social media.

Aba (Abā; Persian: عبا) and Ammame ( `emãmah) are clothes of Muslim clergy and some believe that this dress is the dress of the Prophet of Islam and should be respected.

History 
Ammameparani occurred for the first time in contemporary history of Iran during the Triumph of Tehran in 1909 of the Constitutional Revolution, when Yusuf-Khan threw the turban of Sheikh Fazlullah Nouri to protesting crowd.

Ruhollah Khomeini, the founder of the Islamic Republic of Iran, was the first person to demand the taking off of the turbans of mullahs in a speech against them. He delivered it while in exile in Najaf, Iraq and calling the Iranian clerics derogatorily "court mullahs" (mullahs who supported the Pahlavi) or "corrupt mullahs", he said: "Our youth should pick up the turbans of the mullahs who create corruption in the Muslim society in the name of Islamic jurists. There is no need to beat them too much but pick up their turbans."

Mahsa Amini protests 
During Iranians' nationwide protests of 2022, knocking off turbans became a political campaign and as of 3 November 2022 it is expanding. People throw off the turbans of the clergy to declare that they are dissatisfied with the religious government and the leaders of the Islamic Republic.

Reactions 

Moqtada as-Sadr, an Iraqi cleric and one of the leaders of the Iraqi Shiites, criticized this action and expressed concern about its possible spread to other Muslim countries.
In response to "ammameparani", a parallel campaign called "ammamebusi" (Persian:عمامه‌بوسی; "turban kissing") was launched. Some people in Iran and Iraq kissed mullahs' turbans to show respect to the clergy and published the video of their act on social media.

See also
Estates of the realm#First Estate
Ulama

Sources 

Mahsa Amini protests